The Speedway Under-21 World Championship is an annual speedway event held each year organized by the International Motorcycling Federation (FIM) since 1977.

As of 2022, the title was awarded to the winner of the SGP2 category at the FIM Speedway World Championship.

History 
Between 1977 and 1987 the Championship was the called Individual Speedway Junior European Championship (European Speedway Under 21 Championship), open only to European riders. In 1979, the Championship allowed riders from other continents to compete, but was renamed to the Speedway World Under 21 Championship in 1988. 
A new competition was named Individual Speedway Junior European Championship was founded by the European Motorcycle Union (UEM) in  1998, only open to European competitors.

Originally it was called the European Under-21 Championship (from 1977-1987) but changed its name in 1988 when it was made open to all nations. To confuse matters a new European Individual Speedway Junior Championship was created in 1998 by the European Motorcycle Union (UEM) but this is not linked to former European Under-21 Championship.

Maksym Drabik (2017 and 2019), along with Emil Sayfutdinov from Russia (2007 and 2008)  and Darcy Ward from Australia (2009 and 2010) are the only double U-21 World Champions.

Age limits 
The minimum age  of a rider to compete is 16 years of age (starting on the date of the rider's birthday). The maximum age is 21 years of age (finishing at the end of the year in which the rider celebrates his 21st birthday).

World Champions
The following World Junior champions went on to win the Speedway World Championship.
Per Jonsson in 1990
Gary Havelock in 1992
Jason Crump in 2004, 2006 and 2009
Bartosz Zmarzlik in 2019 and 2020

Past winners

European Championship (1977-1987)

World Championship (since 1988)

One-day final (1988–2009)

Final series (since 2010–2021)

SGP2 (2022–)

Medal winners per nation

See also 
 Team Speedway Junior World Championship (U-21)
 Individual Speedway World Championship, Speedway Grand Prix
 Individual Speedway Junior European Championship (U-19)

References

 
Individual 21